Ceratoclasis is a genus of moths of the family Crambidae.

Species
Ceratoclasis avilalis Amsel, 1956
Ceratoclasis cyclostigma (Dyar, 1914)
Ceratoclasis delimitalis (Guenée, 1854)
Ceratoclasis discodontalis (Hampson, 1899)
Ceratoclasis imbrexalis (Walker, 1859)
Ceratoclasis lehialis (Druce, 1899)
Ceratoclasis metatalis Möschler, 1890
Ceratoclasis sulpitialis Swinhoe, 1906
Ceratoclasis tenebralis Snellen, 1875

References

Spilomelinae
Crambidae genera
Taxa named by Julius Lederer